Sóller is a town and municipality near the north west coast of the Balearic Island of Mallorca, Spain, 3 km inland from Port de Sóller, in a large, bowl-shaped valley that also includes the village of Fornalutx and the hamlets of Biniaraix and Binibassi. The population is around 14,000. The Tranvía de Sóller tram links Sóller to Port de Sóller.

Overview
Sóller is linked by the historic railway, the Ferrocarril de Sóller, and by a highway with a tunnel, to the Majorcan capital of Palma. The Ferrocaril was built on the profits from the orange and lemon trade and completed in 1911. The Andratx-Pollença highway also runs through the valley. The present-day economy is based mainly on tourism and the expenditure of foreign residents, complementary to the agricultural economy based around citrus and olive groves.  Soller is unique compared to towns on the rest of the island due to its geographical isolation, being surrounded by the Serra de Tramuntana. This isolation from all other major towns on the island, made it easier to trade with French merchants arriving by sea.

Main sights
 

The focus of the town is the Plaça Constitució which is surrounded by cafés and has plane trees and a fountain in its centre. The tram passes through the Plaça on its way to and from the main station which has been restored to incorporate a museum of Picasso and Joan Miró. The church of Sant Bartomeu (Saint Bartholomew) facing the east side of the Plaça is flanked by the ajuntament (town hall) and the Banco de Sóller, a remarkable 1912 Modernista building with defining ironwork, by the Catalan architect Joan Rubió i Bellver, a follower of Antoni Gaudí. The bank's organisation was founded in 1889 with the money of emigrants who returned prosperous to Sóller. On the other hand, the church can clearly be seen standing out from the canopy of the town from other parts of the Vall de Sóller (the surrounding valley). The original building dates from some time before 1236. The current main interior structure is now largely baroque (1688–1733).

The campanar (belltower) blends in well with its neo-gothic design. The remarkable façade is a 1904 construction, also by Joan Rubió. The old street plan is of Islamic origin and lined with historic houses of the sixteenth to eighteenth centuries. The town has a covered market and is bisected by a fast flowing river with a number of bridges. Sóller is also notable for the houses built in the early twentieth century by emigrants who returned wealthy to the town, particularly those on the Gran Via which reflect the fin de siècle Art Nouveau styles of France.

The renowned Jardí Botanic (botanical garden) is on the outskirts of the town and is laid out with the plants of the Balearics and the Mediterranean islands. The Modernista mansion in the garden houses El Museu Balear de Ciències Naturals (The Museum of Balearic Natural Sciences).

Events
Since 1980, Sóller has hosted a week-long international folklore festival every May.

Notable people

Gregorio Bausá (1590-1656), painter
Albert Hauf (b. 1938), philologist
Joan Miquel Oliver (b. 1974), musician
Tuni (b. 1982), footballer
Colm Meaney (b. 1953), Irish actor

Gallery

See also

Cercle Solleric
CF Sóller
Els Cornadors
Ferrocarril de Sóller
Port de Sóller
Tranvía de Sóller

References

External links

Sóller Tourist Guide
Veu de Sóller (local weekly newspaper), in Catalan
Setmanari Sóller (local newspaper), in Catalan.
Jardín Botánico (botanical garden), in Catalan and Spanish
Museu de Ciencias Naturales
Ajuntament de Sóller (Townhall of Sóller), in English

 
Populated places in Mallorca